Märchen Awakens Romance, officially abbreviated as MÄR, is a Japanese manga series written and illustrated by Nobuyuki Anzai, serialized in Shogakukan's shōnen manga magazine Weekly Shōnen Sunday from January 2003 to July 2006, with its chapters collected in 15 tankōbon volumes. The story follows 14-year-old junior high student Ginta Toramizu who is transported into a fantasy-based world known as MÄR-Heaven. As Ginta ventures in the world of MÄR-Heaven, he encounters allies and antagonists.

A 102-episode anime television series adaptation titled MÄR Heaven was broadcast on TV Tokyo from April 2005 to March 2007.

In North America, Viz Media has licensed both the MÄR manga and anime for an English-language release. The manga was published between July 2005 and June 2007. The anime aired first in July 2006 on Toonami Jetstream, an online service from Cartoon Network, and then on the network itself, as part of the Toonami programming block in December 2006.

A manga sequel, MÄR Omega, written by Anzai and illustrated by Kōichirō Hoshino, was published in Weekly Shōnen Sunday from September 2006 to June 2007, with its chapters collected in four tankōbon volumes.

Plot

Ginta Toramizu is a 14-year-old junior high student from Tokyo. He is a near-sighted, video game geek, underachieving student and a fan of fairy tales. One day and without warning, he finds himself summoned to the mysterious world of MÄR Heaven, which he has only seen before in his dreams and in his mother's books. In this fairy tale world, Ginta's physical weakness is replaced with superior physical strength, incredible stamina and endurance, being able to see without his glasses.

Upon meeting a mysterious 16-year-old witch named Dorothy, Ginta is introduced to the powerful magical accessories and weapons called "ÄRMs". Dorothy plans to steal the mysterious ÄRM Babbo, from a trap-guarded cave, and brings Ginta along to assist her, intrigued by his unusual strength and abilities. Babbo is revealed to be an extremely special and unique ÄRM, as he possesses a will of his own and the ability to speak. Displeased with the fact that Babbo is so cumbersome, Dorothy gives Babbo to Ginta instead, departing with a warning that others will try to steal Babbo from him.

Ginta continues on a journey of discovery, reveling in this new world. When Ginta encounters the farmer Jack and his mother, who are troubled by two werewolf brothers, he finds that he misses the real world. Ginta resolves to find a way to reach home while enjoying as much of MÄR as he can along the way, with Jack journeying with him. However, it is not long before Ginta learns that the world of MÄR Heaven is not as peaceful as it seems when he is attacked by thieves wishing to steal Babbo.

Upon meeting a boy named Alviss, who summoned him to MÄR Heaven using an ÄRM known as the Gate Keeper Clown, Ginta learns of the sinister Chess Pieces, an organization who tried to take over MÄR Heaven six years earlier. Alviss reveals that he summoned Ginta in order to gain assistance from an "other-worlder" in the upcoming war, as was done previously, and that Babbo originally belonged to one of the knights of the Chess Pieces. Gaining both allies and enemies, the series follows Ginta as he opposes the Chess Pieces, led by King Orb, Queen Diana and her servant Phantom.

MÄR Omega
Set six years after the events of MÄR, the story follows Kai, the adoptive son of an ÄRM smith. Kai idolizes Ginta and dreams of having an ÄRM for himself, despite not having magic power. Kai, however, inherited a magic stone from his dead parents; a memento that suggests his family's relation to the sorcerer kingdom of Caldia, birthplace of all ÄRMs and magic users. At the time throughout MÄR-Heaven, a new type of ÄRM, known as "Fake ÄRM", which is activated without magic power, became highly used.

On an errand, Kai is suddenly attacked by a remnant of the Chess Pieces. Kai jumps into a pond, where he meets Babbo. Using the ÄRM, Kai defeats the Chess Piece. Babbo wonders how Kai was able to use him, being a normal boy with no powers. Kai returns to his home alongside Babbo. Upon returning, Kai discovers that the Fake ÄRM users are possessed and want to take Babbo to bring him to a sinister mysterious figure who was watching them the whole time. Alviss comes to help and reveals that the Fake ÄRMs absorb the life energy from their users, allowing to control their minds in the process.

Kai, alongside Babbo, Alviss and his friend Elise, go to Caldia to seek help. They are welcomed into the Grand Elder's palace by Dorothy and a young wizard, Inga. The Grand Elder tells them that over 300 years ago the Fake ÄRMs were created by a dark magician, Unwetter, who experimented with the human mind manipulation. Babbo, the Elder of Caldia at the time, defeated him, consigning him and his malicious creations into oblivion, just before dying, transferring his soul into the ÄRM and erasing every memory related to the incident.

The Grand Elder does not know, however, why the supposedly sealed Fake ÄRMs were once again spread throughout MÄR Heaven, how the supposedly dead Unwetter could have been revived or what his goals are. The Grand Elder decides to seal Babbo to avoid more trouble, to which Kai disagrees. The Grand Elder orders Kai to prove himself worthy of wielding Babbo. Kai eventually unleashes all his dormant magic power, which is so powerful that confirms his relation to the magic kingdom and a direct blood connection to Babbo, finding out that he is one of his descendants.

A group of Fake ÄRM users present themselves before Caldia to take Babbo back to Unwetter. Kai and crew are able to fight them back with the assistance of Inga, who is revealed to be a descendant of Unwetter. Following Caldia's law, they must seek Unwetter out and kill him. Kai, alongside Inga and Elise go on a journey to find Babbo's magic stones, which would restore his memories of the Grand Elder who fought the Fake Arms and Unwetter 300 years ago, and save MÄR Heaven.

Media

Manga

Written and illustrated by Nobuyuki Anzai, MÄR was serialized in Shogakukan's shōnen manga magazine Weekly Shōnen Sunday from January 7, 2003, to July 5, 2006. Shogakukan collected its chapters in 15 tankōbon volumes released from May 17, 2003, to August 11, 2006.

In North America, the series was licensed for an English language release by Viz Media. The first volume was released on May 3, 2005, and the fifteenth on September 18, 2007.

A sequel titled MÄR Omega, written by Anzai but illustrated by Kōichirō Hoshino, was published in Weekly Shōnen Sunday from September 13, 2006, to June 27, 2007. Its chapters were collected in four tankōbon volumes published from December 16, 2006, to August 10, 2007.

Anime

An anime television series adaptation titled , produced by SynergySP, premiered on TV Tokyo on April 3, 2005, where it ran for 102 episodes until its conclusion on March 25, 2007.

In North America, the anime was licensed by Viz Media and aired on Cartoon Network's online broadband service Toonami Jetstream in July 2006, and the series premiered on their television programming block Toonami, on December 23, 2006. It also premiered in Canada on YTV channel on June 1, 2007. Viz Media began releasing the series to DVD on June 12, 2007, with each disc containing 4 episodes. Four volumes were released before Viz delisted the series in favor of other titles. In June 2011, the first 52 episodes were available on Netflix's Instant streaming service.

Video games

Notes

References

External links
 Official TV Tokyo MÄR site 
 Official Viz Media MÄR site
 

 
2003 manga
2006 manga
Adventure anime and manga
Comedy anime and manga
Isekai anime and manga
Konami franchises
Shogakukan manga
Shogakukan franchises
Shōnen manga
Supernatural anime and manga
Toonami
TV Tokyo original programming
Viz Media anime
Viz Media manga